PSLV-C40 was the 42nd mission of the Indian Polar Satellite Launch Vehicle (PSLV) program in the XL configuration.  PSLV-C40 successfully carried and deployed 31 satellites in sun-synchronous orbits.

Overview
Two Surrey Satellite Technology satellites were launched, the 100 kg Carbonite-2 Earth Observation technology demonstrator and the 168 kg Telesat LEO Phase 1 communications satellite.

Four SpaceBEE sub-CubeSats were launched to test "2-way satellite communications and data relay", probably for the Silicon Valley company Swarm Technologies. However the U.S. Federal Communications Commission (FCC) had denied regulatory approval for Swarm Technologies 10 cm × 10 cm × 2.8 cm BEE satellites as they were too small to be reliably tracked by the United States Space Surveillance Network, so may become an impact hazard to other satellites. If confirmed the FCC may take regulatory action over these satellites.

Launched satellites

 Astranis DemoSat-2
 Carbonite-2
 Cartosat-2F (Cartosat-2 series satellite)
 ICEYE-X1
 INS-1C
 Microsat
 PicSat
 Arkyd-6

References

External links

Polar Satellite Launch Vehicle
Spacecraft launched by India in 2018
January 2018 events in India